Mariano Reutemann (born 16 March 1977) is an Argentinian windsurfer. He has competed at the Olympics since 2004 in the RS:X. Mariano won the bronze medal at the 2015 Pan American Games and the silver medal at the 2011 Pan American Games and 2007.

Results

References

External links 
 
 
 

1977 births
Living people
Argentine male sailors (sport)
Argentine windsurfers
Olympic sailors of Argentina
Sailors at the 2004 Summer Olympics – Mistral One Design
Sailors at the 2008 Summer Olympics – RS:X
Sailors at the 2012 Summer Olympics – RS:X
Pan American Games silver medalists for Argentina
Pan American Games bronze medalists for Argentina
Sailors at the 2007 Pan American Games
Sailors at the 2011 Pan American Games
Sailors at the 2015 Pan American Games
Pan American Games medalists in sailing
Medalists at the 2007 Pan American Games
Medalists at the 2011 Pan American Games
Medalists at the 2015 Pan American Games